Eugene Antonio Marino, SSJ (May 29, 1934 – November 12, 2000) was an American Catholic prelate who served as Archbishop of Atlanta, Georgia from 1988 until 1990, becoming the first African American archbishop in history. He was also the first such auxiliary bishop in Washington, D.C. and the first to be secretary of the National Conference of Catholic Bishops.

During his time as archbishop of Atlanta, he helped address the conduct of other priests, until his own relationship with a lay minister became public knowledge. He soon resigned, later working as a chaplain and counselor until his death in 2000.

Biography

Early life and education 
Marino was born in Biloxi, Mississippi, the sixth of a total of eight children to baker and Puerto Rican Jesús María Marino and Lottie Irene Bradford Marino, an African American maid. He attended parochial schools in Biloxi before joining the Josephites. He attended Epiphany Apostolic College in New York and later earned his master's degree from St. Joseph's Seminary in Washington, DC. He also completed a master's degree in religious education at Fordham University in The Bronx. He was ordained a priest in 1962.

Priesthood 
After ordination, Marino taught religion and physical science at Epiphany College in Newburgh, NY for seven years. He was the spiritual director at St. Joseph's Seminary in Washington, D.C. from 1968 until 1971, when he became vicar general of the Josephites.

Episcopacy 
From September 12, 1974 until 1988 he was an auxiliary bishop for the Washington archdiocese, the first of four African Americans to hold this position, as well as becoming the secretary of the National Conference of Catholic Bishops in 1985, the first African American to hold that position. In 1987 he organized a trip for a number of African American Catholics to see Pope John Paul II, and during a talk with these men and women, he stated:

Marino went on to become the first African American archbishop in American history when he was installed as Archbishop of Atlanta on May 5, 1988, becoming involved in efforts to address the sexual misconduct of priests.

Sexual misconduct
Marino, however, was himself engaged in an affair with a female lay minister during this period, which became public knowledge in 1990. The lay minister, Vicki Long, revealed that she had been secretly married to Marino in 1988. 

Following these events, after just two years as archbishop of Atlanta, Marino, who had been in seclusion since June 1, 1990, resigned on 10 July 1990 and cited "spiritual renewal, psychological therapy and medical supervision" as the reason. He then took a six-week-long period of counseling. Retaining his title of archbishop, Marino quietly went to Michigan and took a post as chaplain at the Sisters of Mercy in Alma up until 1995. From then until 2000, he worked in a counseling program at St. Vincent's Hospital Westchester in Harrison, New York, counseling on sexual behavior and substance abuse.

Death
In the early morning hours of November 12, 2000, while ministering at Salesian High School in New Rochelle, New York as a counselor and confidant for the personal problems of fellow priests and nuns, Marino died at age 66 at the St. Ignatius Retreat House in Manhasset, New York. He was discovered in bed by the housekeeper and it was established that he had died of a heart attack. He was buried in Biloxi, Mississippi. Of his eight siblings, one brother and four sisters survived him.

References

1934 births
2000 deaths
People from Biloxi, Mississippi
20th-century Roman Catholic archbishops in the United States
Loyola University Chicago alumni
Fordham University alumni
American people of Puerto Rican descent
Burials in Mississippi
Roman Catholic archbishops of Atlanta
Catholics from Mississippi
African-American Roman Catholic archbishops
Josephite bishops
Epiphany Apostolic College
St. Joseph's Seminary (Washington, DC)
Afro-Latino culture in the United States
Latin American people of African descent
Puerto Rican people of African-American descent
Puerto Rican people of African descent
African-American Catholic consecrated religious